The Indian locomotive class WDG-5 (EMD GT50AC) is a class of heavy haul Diesel-electric locomotive built by Banaras Locomotive Works, Varanasi in collaboration with Electro-Motive Diesel. Derived from the EMD SD80MAC, it was meant as a direct upgrade to the WDG-4 GT46MAC (SD70MAC derivative). The locomotive series is named Bheem, after the strong Pandav brother from epic Mahabharata. The loco has an EMD 20N-710G3B-EC 20 cylinder engine of the EMD SD80MAC and an AC-AC transmission. Since the loco has been developed by installing a v20-710 prime mover and replacing the standard v16 in the WDG4 GT46MAC locomotive, the model was re-designated by adding 4 to the predecessor model, becoming GT-50, owing to the number of cylinders going from 16 to 20. 

Development of this locomotive is one of the Best Examples of Atma-Nirbhar Bharat. The class was stopped only with 7 units due to the v20-710 powerpack having high fuel consumption, similar to why the original SD80MAC were discontinued and were ultimately scrapped. Compounding the issue was Indian Railways aiming for complete network electrification as part of the Net Zero-Carbon Emission programme, during which it discontinued building EMD locomotives and transitioned to greener diesel locomotives based on General Electric (GE)'s GEvo Evolution Series platform. Examples of such are the 4,500 hp (3.4 MW) WDG-4G (GE ES43ACmi) that uses the 12-cylinder version of the GEvo Prime Mover, and the 6,000 hp (4.5 MW) WDG-6G (GE ES58ACmi) that uses the 16-cylinder version of the same engine.

Locomotive shed

References

See also
EMD SD80MAC
List of diesel locomotives of India
Indian locomotive class WDG-4
Indian Railways
Rail transport in India

G-5
Co-Co locomotives
Electro-Motive Diesel locomotives
5 ft 6 in gauge locomotives